Ricardo Franco Cázares (born 16 November 1970) is a Mexican politician affiliated with the National Action Party. As of 2014 he served as Deputy of the LX Legislature of the Mexican Congress representing Baja California.

References

1970 births
Living people
Politicians from Durango
People from Durango City
National Action Party (Mexico) politicians
21st-century Mexican politicians
Deputies of the LX Legislature of Mexico
Members of the Chamber of Deputies (Mexico) for Baja California